Bruno Boban (12 August 1992 – 24 March 2018) was a Croatian footballer who played professionally for NK Zagreb. He died while representing Marsonia, after collapsing in a game against Slavonija Požega.

Career statistics

Club

Notes

References

1992 births
2018 deaths
Croatian footballers
Association football midfielders
First Football League (Croatia) players
Croatian Football League players
NK Zagreb players
NK Marsonia players
Association football players who died while playing
Sport deaths in Croatia
People from Požega, Croatia